Ahmed Mohammed Inuwa is a Nigerian politician and civil engineer who was elected to the Nigerian Senate in  2003 on the platform of People's Democratic Party (PDP) for the Kwara North constituency of Kwara State. He nurses an ambition to contest the gubernatorial position in Kwara state in 2011. He is currently a card carrying member of the All Progressive Congress.

Background

Ahmed Mohammed Inuwa was born on 19 September 1948. He obtained a bachelor's degree in government from Ahmadu Bello University, Zaria, a diploma in development Administration from the University of Birmingham, United Kingdom and an Mni (Member National Institute) from the National Institute for Policy and Strategic Studies in Kuru, Nigeria, Jos.

Senate career

Inuwa was elected to the National Senate for the Kwara North constituency in 2003 and reelected in 2007. He was appointed to committees on Education, Culture & Tourism, Appropriation, Agriculture and Health. By the middle of his second term, he initiated a bill seeking to "Establish Chartered Pension Institute of Nigeria".

References

Living people
1948 births
People from Kwara State
Peoples Democratic Party members of the Senate (Nigeria)
21st-century Nigerian politicians